The Princeton Public Library serves the town of Princeton, New Jersey.  It is the most visited municipal public library in New Jersey with over 860,000 annual visitors who borrow 550,000 items, ask more than 83,000 reference questions, log onto library computers over 90,000 times, and attend more than 1,300 programs.  Its usage exceeds all but five of New Jersey's twenty-one county systems.  Compared to New Jersey's largest municipal library, Newark, Princeton spends four times as much per capita, and has nearly double the number of visitors and circulation in absolute terms despite a tenth the population.

History

Bainbridge House

The town of Princeton's first purpose built libraries, among the first in the country, were those of the Princeton Theological Seminary, Lenox Library (1843), and Princeton University, Chancellor Green Library (1873).  The town itself however would not have a library to call its own until the twentieth century.

The Princeton Public Library opened in 1909, and has had three different homes. The library was originally located at the historic Bainbridge House on Nassau Street, which is the current home of the Princeton Historical Society.  Bainbridge house had been built in 1766 by Job Stockton and was the birthplace of naval hero William Bainbridge.  The house came into the ownership of Princeton University, which rented it to the library for $1 a year.

Witherspoon Street

The growing library moved in 1966 to a building at 65 Witherspoon Street.  By 2002 the library had a collection of 130,000 books in a building designed for 80,000 and the decision was made to build a new home for the library on the same site. The library was then moved to a temporary location at 301 North Harrison Street during the construction of the new , state-of-the-art library which was opened at 65 Witherspoon Street in April 2004. The new building and the library's new logos and signage were designed by Hillier Architecture.  The building is named for George and Estelle Sands, who made a $5 million donation, with half going to provide an endowment.  The J. Seward Johnson Charitable Trust donated $1 million and the university $400,000.  The total cost of the new building was $18 million with two-thirds of that raised from private donations, $4 million from Princeton Township, and $2 million from Princeton Borough.

Technological Services

Technology 

 The Technology Center is outfitted with 12 Retina iMacs, A/V projection system and lectern. Select iMacs include premium software such as Adobe Creative Cloud. The Technology Center is open whenever classes are not in session. Computers on the second floor are primarily intended for classes, study, and work. Gaming by youth under the age of 18 is not permitted but is allowed on the third floor computers.

 Tech classes are offered to train patrons in a variety of technology at all levels. A PPL card is not required
 There is free Wi-Fi with speeds up to 250 Mbps
 Printing services, as well as copying, scanning, and faxing

References

External links
 Princeton Public Library

Buildings and structures in Princeton, New Jersey
Public libraries in New Jersey
Education in Mercer County, New Jersey
Libraries established in 1909